Babice Gornje  is a village in the municipality of Lukavac, Bosnia and Herzegovina.

Demographics 
According to the 2013 census, its population was 400.

References

Populated places in Lukavac